The Nordsvorka Hydroelectric Power Station is a hydroelectric power station in the municipality of Surnadal in Møre og Romsdal county, Norway. The river flows from the lake Geitøyvatnet (approximately ) to the lake Langvatnet (approximately ). The plant came into operation in 2007 and is owned 50% each by Svorka Energi and Statkraft.

References

Hydroelectric power stations in Norway
Surnadal
Energy infrastructure completed in 2007